Zakiya Ali Mal Allah 'Abd al-'Aziz (born 1959) is a Qatari poet. Her poetry has been translated into Spanish, Urdu and Turkish.

Zakiya Mal Allah is a graduate of Cairo University, has a doctorate in pharmacy, and has been head of the Quality Control Department in the Department of Pharmacy and Drug Control laboratory of Qatar's Supreme Council of Health. She has published nine books of poetry, and her poetry has been included in English-language anthologies. She has also written for Qatari newspapers, including Al-Watan and Al Sharq.

References

1959 births
Living people
Qatari poets
Qatari women writers